Enrico Lorenzetti (4 January 1911 – 8 August 1989) was an Italian professional Grand Prix motorcycle road racer who competed in the 1940s and 1950s.

He competed in the 1949 season riding a 500 cc Moto Guzzi and finished eighth overall with 7 points behind Johnny Lockett. In 1952, he won the 250 cc World Championship for Moto Guzzi.

Motorcycle Grand Prix results 
1949 point system:

Points system from 1950 to 1968:

(Races in italics indicate fastest lap)

References 

Italian motorcycle racers
250cc World Championship riders
350cc World Championship riders
500cc World Championship riders
Isle of Man TT riders
1911 births
1989 deaths
250cc World Riders' Champions